Pyrgocythara is a genus of sea snails, marine gastropod mollusks in the family Mangeliidae.

The type species is  the Pliocene: Pyrgocythara eminula , which is probably the same as the Recent Pleurotoma trilineata  (synonym of Cryoturris trilineata )

Distribution
This genus occurs in the Western Atlantic Ocean, the Caribbean Sea and the Gulf of Mexico.

Species
Species within the genus Pyrgocythara include:

 Pyrgocythara albovittata 
 Pyrgocythara angulosa 
 Pyrgocythara annaclaireleeae 
 Pyrgocythara astricta  (nomen dubium)
 Pyrgocythara cinctella 
 Pyrgocythara crassicostata 
 Pyrgocythara danae 
 Pyrgocythara densestriata 
 Pyrgocythara dubia 
 Pyrgocythara emersoni 
 Pyrgocythara emeryi 
 † Pyrgocythara eminula 
 Pyrgocythara filosa 
 Pyrgocythara fuscoligata 
 Pyrgocythara guarani 
 Pyrgocythara hamata 
 Pyrgocythara helena 
 Pyrgocythara hemphilli 
 Pyrgocythara juliocesari 
 Pyrgocythara laqueata  (taxon inquirendum)
 Pyrgocythara mairelae 
 Pyrgocythara melita 
 Pyrgocythara mighelsi 
 Pyrgocythara nodulosa 
 Pyrgocythara plicosa 
 Pyrgocythara scammoni 
 Pyrgocythara subdiaphana 
 † Pyrgocythara turrispiralata 
 Pyrgocythara urceolata 
 Pyrgocythara vicina 

Species brought into synonymy
 Pyrgocythara arbela : synonym of Pyrgocythara hemphilli 
 Pyrgocythara balteata : synonym of Ithycythara lanceolata   (nomen dubium)
 Pyrgocythara brunnea : synonym of Pyrgocythara plicosa 
 Pyrgocythara candidissima : synonym of Agathotoma candidissima 
 Pyrgocythara caribaea : synonym of Pyrgocythara cinctella 
 Pyrgocythara cerea : synonym of Pyrgocythara hamata 
 Pyrgocythara coxi : synonym of Agathotoma coxi 
 Pyrgocythara fusca : synonym of Pyrgocythara cinctella 
 Pyrgocythara hilli : synonym of Pyrgocythara melita 
 Pyrgocythara jewetti : synonym of Pyrgocythara plicosa 
 Pyrgocythara lavalleana : synonym of Cryoturris lavalleana 
 Pyrgocythara luteofasciata  : synonym of Pyrgocythara albovittata 
 Pyrgocythara metria : synonym of Vitricythara metria 
 Pyrgocythara obesicostata : synonym of Pyrgocythara guarani 
 Pyrgocythara pederseni : synonym of Pyrgocythara danae 
 Pyrgocythara phaethusa : synonym of Notocytharella phaethusa 
 Pyrgocythara plicata : synonym of Pyrgocythara plicosa

References

 Woodring, W.P. (1928) Miocene mollusks from Bowden, Jamaica. Part II. Gastropods and discussion of results. Contributions to the geology and paleontology of the West Indies. Carnegie Institution of Washington Publication, 385, vii + 1–564, 40 pls.

External links
 Todd, Jonathan A. "Systematic list of gastropods in the Panama Paleontology Project collections." Budd and Foster 2006 (1996)
 Scarponi, Daniele, et al. "Middle Miocene conoidean gastropods from western Ukraine (Paratethys): Integrative taxonomy, palaeoclimatogical and palaeobiogeographical implications." Acta Palaeontologica Polonica 61.2 (2015): 327-344.
  Bouchet P., Kantor Yu.I., Sysoev A. & Puillandre N. (2011) A new operational classification of the Conoidea. Journal of Molluscan Studies 77: 273-308.
 
 Worldwide Mollusc Species Data Base: Mangeliidae